These are the results of the Men's C-2 10000 metres competition in canoeing at the 1948 Summer Olympics.  The C-2 event is raced by two-man sprint canoes. Heats and final took place on August 11.

Final
With only six teams competing, a final was held.

References
1948 Summer Olympics official report. p. 313.
Sports reference.com 1948 C-2 10000 m results.

Men's C-2 10000
Men's events at the 1948 Summer Olympics